Walter Baine (born 1781)  was a Liberal Party politician.  He was the Member of Parliament (MP) for Greenock from 1845 to 1847.

References 

People from Greenock
Members of the Parliament of the United Kingdom for Scottish constituencies
1781 births
Year of death missing
Scottish Liberal Party MPs
UK MPs 1841–1847